Herodes Atticus (AD 101–177) was an  Athenian rhetorician, as well as a Roman senator. A great philanthropic magnate, he and his wife Appia Annia Regilla, for whose murder he was potentially responsible, commissioned many Athenian public works, several of which stand to the present day. "[O]ne of the best-known figures of the Antonine Period", he taught rhetoric to the Roman emperors Marcus Aurelius and Lucius Verus, and was advanced to the  consulship in 143. His full name as a Roman citizen was Lucius Vibullius Hipparchus Tiberius Claudius Atticus Herodes.

According to Philostratus, Herodes Atticus, in possession of the best education that money can buy, was a notable proponent of the Second Sophistic. Having gone through the cursus honorum of civil posts, he demonstrated a talent for civil engineering, especially the design and construction of water-supply systems. The Nymphaeum at Olympia was one of his dearest projects. However, he never lost sight of philosophy and rhetoric, becoming a teacher himself. One of his students was the young Marcus Aurelius, last of the  "Five Good Emperors". M.I. Finley describes Herodes Atticus as "patron of the arts and letters (and himself a writer and scholar of importance), public benefactor on an imperial scale, not only in Athens but elsewhere in Greece and Asia Minor, holder of many important posts, friend and kinsman of emperors."

Ancestry and family
Herodes Atticus was a Greek of Athenian descent. His ancestry could be traced to the Athenian noblewoman Elpinice, a half-sister of the statesman Cimon and daughter of Miltiades. He claimed lineage from a series of mythic Greek kings: Theseus, Cecrops, and Aeacus, as well as the god Zeus. He had an ancestor four generations removed from him called Polycharmus, who may have been the Archon of Athens of that name from 9/8 BC–22/23. His family bore the Roman family name Claudius. There is a possibility that a paternal ancestor of his received Roman citizenship from an unknown member of the Claudian gens.

Herodes Atticus was born to a distinguished and very rich family of consular rank. His parents were a Roman Senator of Greek descent, Tiberius Claudius Atticus Herodes, and the wealthy heiress Vibullia Alcia Agrippina. He had a brother named Tiberius Claudius Atticus Herodianus and a sister named Claudia Tisamenis. His maternal grandparents were Claudia Alcia and Lucius Vibullius Rufus, while his paternal grandfather was Hipparchus.

His parents were related as uncle and niece. His maternal grandmother and his father were sister and brother. His maternal uncle Lucius Vibullius Hipparchus was an Archon of Athens in the years 99–100 and his maternal cousin, Publius Aelius Vibullius Rufus, was an Archon of Athens between 143–144.

Life
 

Herodes Atticus was born in Marathon, Greece, and spent his childhood years between Greece and Italy. According to Juvenal he received an education in rhetoric and philosophy from many of the best teachers from both Greek and Roman culture. Throughout his life, however, Herodes Atticus remained entirely Greek in his cultural outlook.

He was a student of Favorinus, and inherited Favorinus' library. Like Favorinus, he was a harsh critic of Stoicism.

these disciplines of the cult of the unemotional, who want to be considered calm, brave, and steadfast because they show neither desire nor grief, neither anger nor pleasure, cut out the more active emotions of the spirit and grow old in a torpor, a sluggish, enervated life.

In 125, Emperor Hadrian appointed him prefect of the free cities in the Roman province of Asia. He later returned to Athens, where he became famous as a teacher. In the year 140, Herodes Atticus was elected and served as an Archon of Athens. Later that same year, the Emperor Antoninus Pius invited him to Rome from Athens to educate his two adopted sons, the future Emperors Marcus Aurelius and Lucius Verus. Sometime after, he was betrothed to Appia Annia Regilla, a wealthy aristocrat, who was related to the wife of Antoninus Pius, Faustina the Elder. When Regilla and Herodes Atticus married, she was 14 years old and he was 40. As Herodes Atticus was in favor with the Emperor, as a mark of his friendship Antoninus Pius appointed him Consul in 143.

Herodes Atticus and Regilla controlled a large tract around the Third Mile of the Appian Way outside Rome, which was known as the "Triopio" (from Triopas, King of Thessaly). For his remaining years he travelled between Greece and Italy.

Some time after his consulship, he returned to Greece permanently with his wife and their children.

In 160, the year that her brother was consul, Regilla, while eight months pregnant, was brutally kicked in the abdomen by a freedman of Herodes Atticus named Alcimedon. This caused her to go into premature labor, killing her. Consul Appius Annius Atilius Bradua brought charges against his brother-in-law in Rome, alleging that Herodes Atticus had had ordered her beaten to death; the emperor Marcus Aurelius exonerated his old tutor of his wife's murder.

Herodes Atticus was the teacher of three notable students: Achilles, Memnon and Polydeuces (Polydeukes). "The aged Herodes Atticus in a public paroxysm of despair at the death of his perhaps eromenos Polydeukes, commissioned games, inscriptions and sculptures on a lavish scale and then died, inconsolable, shortly afterwards."

Herodes Atticus had a distinguished reputation for his literary work, most of which is now lost, and was a philanthropist and patron of public works. He funded a number of building projects, including:
 The Panathenaic Stadium – Athens
 Odeon – Athens; built to honor the memory of his wife
 A theater at Corinth
 A stadium at Delphi
 The baths at Thermopylae
 An aqueduct at Canusium in Italy
 An aqueduct at Alexandria Troas
 A nymphaeum (monumental fountain) with his wife at Olympia
 various benefactions to the peoples of  Thessaly, Epirus Euboea, Boeotia and Peloponnesus

He also contemplated cutting a canal through the Isthmus of Corinth, but was deterred from carrying out the plan because the same thing had been unsuccessfully attempted before by the emperor Nero.

Throughout his life, Herodes Atticus had a stormy relationship with the citizens of Athens, but before he died he was reconciled with them. When he died, the citizens of Athens gave him an honored burial, his funeral taking place in the Panathinaiko Stadium in Athens, which he had commissioned.

Children
Regilla bore Herodes Atticus six children, of whom three survived to adulthood. Their children were:

 Son, Claudius – born and died in 141
 Daughter, Elpinice – born as Appia Annia Claudia Atilia Regilla Elpinice Agrippina Atria Polla, 142–165
 Daughter, Athenais (Marcia Annia Claudia Alcia Athenais Gavidia Latiaria), married Lucius Vibullius Rufus. They had a son, Lucius Vibullius Hipparchus, the only recorded grandchild of Herodes Atticus.
 Son, Atticus Bradua – born in 145 as Tiberius Claudius Marcus Appius Atilius Bradua Regillus Atticus
 Son, Regillus – born as Tiberius Claudius Herodes Lucius Vibullius Regillus, 150–155
 Unnamed child who died with Regilla or died even perhaps three months later in 160

After Regilla died in 160, Herodes Atticus never married again. When he died in 177, his son Atticus Bradua and his grandchildren survived him. Sometime after his wife's death, he adopted his cousin's first grandson Lucius Vibullius Claudius Herodes as his son.

Legacy
Herodes Atticus and his wife Regilla, from the 2nd century until the present, have been considered great benefactors in Greece, in particular in Athens. The couple are commemorated in Herodou Attikou Street and Rigillis Street and Square, in downtown Athens. In Rome, their names are also recorded on modern streets, in the Quarto Miglio suburb close to the area of the Triopio.

References

Sources

Primary sources
 Aulus Gellius, Attic Nights
 Philostratus, Leben der Sophisten. Greek and German by Kai Brodersen. Wiesbaden: Marix 2014, 
 Philostratus, Lives of the Sophists, 2.1 (paragraphs 545–566)

Secondary material
 Day, J., An economic history of Athens under Roman domination, Ayers Company Publishers, 1973
 Gibbon, E., The History of the Decline and Fall of the Roman Empire
 Graindor, P., Un milliardaire antique, Ayers Company Publishers, 1979
 Kennell, Nigel M. "Herodes and the Rhetoric of Tyranny", Classical Philology, 4 (1997), pp. 316–362.
 Lambert, R., Beloved and God: The Story of Hadrian and Antinous, Viking, 1984.
 
 
 Potter, David Stone, The Roman Empire at Bay, AD 18–395, Routledge, 2004. 
 
 Tobin, Jennifer, Herodes Attikos and the City of Athens: Patronage and Conflict Under the Antonines, J. C. Gieben, 1997.
 Wilson, N. G., Encyclopedia of Ancient Greece, Routledge 2006

External links

 Sleepinbuff.com
 Plancia Magna, Aurelia Paulina, and Regilla: Civic Donors

101 births
177 deaths
2nd-century Athenians
2nd-century Roman consuls
Ancient Greek rhetoricians
Claudii
Eponymous archons
Greek philanthropists
People from East Attica
Roman Athens
Roman-era Athenian rhetoricians
Roman-era Sophists